Remote File Sharing (RFS) is a Unix operating system component for sharing resources, such as files, devices, and file system directories, across a network, in a network-independent manner, similar to a distributed file system. It was developed at Bell Laboratories of AT&T in the 1980s, and was first delivered with UNIX System V Release 3 (SVR3). RFS relied on the STREAMS Transport Provider Interface feature of this operating system. It was also included in UNIX System V Release 4, but as that also included the Network File System (NFS) which was based on TCP/IP and more widely supported in the computing industry, RFS was little used. Some licensees of AT&T UNIX System V Release 4 did not include RFS support in SVR4 distributions, and Sun Microsystems removed it from Solaris 2.4.

Features
The basic application architecture of RFS is the client–server model, in which a participating host may be a server as well as a client, simultaneously. It was based on different design decisions, in comparison to the Network File System (NFS). Instead of focusing on reliable operation in the presence of failures, it focused on preserving UNIX file system semantics across the network. This enabled the system to provide remote access to hardware resources located on an RFS server. Unlike NFS (before version 4), the RFS server maintains state to keep track of how many times a file has been opened, or the locks established on a file or device.

RFS provides complete UNIX/POSIX file semantics for all file types, including special devices, and named pipes. It supports access controls and record and file locking of remote files in a transparent manner as if the shared files are local. This permitted binary application compatibility when involving network resources. It allows the mounting of devices across the network. For example, /dev/cdrom can be accessed remotely, as if it were a local resource. Access to any specific file or a file system directory is transparent across the network, so that users do not need to know where a file is actually located.

RFS is implemented independently of the underlying network technology. For this it relies on the System V STREAMS mechanism using the Transport Provider Interface.

Remote system call interface

 ACCESS
 SYSACCT
 CHDIR Change directory
 CHMOD Change file mode
 CHOWN Change file owner
 CHROOT
 CLOSE Close a file
 CREAT Create a file
 EXEC Execute a file
 EXECE Execute a file with an environment
 FCNTL
 FSTAT Stat a file using a file descriptor
 FSTATFS Stat a file system using a file descriptor
 IOCTL
 LINK First half of link() operation
 LINK1 Second half of link() operation
 MKNOD Make block or character special file
 OPEN Open a file
 READ Read from a file
 SEEK Seek on a file
 STAT Stat a file using pathname
 STATFS Stat a file system using pathname
 UNLINK
 UTIME
 UTSSYS Return information about a mounted files
 WRITE
 GETDENTS Read directory entries in a file system
 MKDIR
 RMDIR
 SRMOUNT Server side of remote mount
 SRUMOUNT Server side of remote unmount
 COREDUMP Dump core request
 WRITEI Internal form of write system call
 READI Internal form of read system call
 RSIGNAL Sendremote signal
 SYNCTIME Synchronize time between machines
 IPUT Free a remote inode
 IUPDATE Update a remote inode
 UPDATE Write modified buffers back to disk.

See also
 AppleTalk
 Samba
 Server Message Block
 WebDAV

References

Internet protocols
Network file systems
Internet Protocol based network software
UNIX System V